Leptoplectus is a genus of ant-loving beetles in the family Staphylinidae. There are at least four described species in Leptoplectus.

Species
These four species belong to the genus Leptoplectus:
 Leptoplectus perraulti Besuchet, 1993
 Leptoplectus pertenuis (Casey, 1884)
 Leptoplectus remyi (Jeannel, 1961)
 Leptoplectus spinolae (Aubé, 1844)

References

Further reading

 
 

Pselaphinae
Articles created by Qbugbot